Juan Vidal (born 12 February 1977 in Santo Domingo, Dominican Republic), is a Dominican actor currently based in Mexico.

He became known in his native country after winning the Mister Dominican Republic contest in 1995. Subsequently, he participated in the Mister World in Turkey, but he was not chosen. He studied acting and dramaturgy at the Centro de Educación Artística of Televisa.

Career
He began his acting career in the United States on the CBS series The Guiding Light. In 1999, he moved to Mexico, where it has become known for participating in several telenovelas of Televisión Azteca. His entire acting career has been mostly in Mexico, although he has also participated in several theater plays in United States and the Dominican Republic. Vidal has been the only TV Azteca actor to be recognized at the TVyNovelas Awards, although currently it does not have an exclusive contract with the network.

Filmography

References

External links 
 

1977 births
Living people
People educated at Centro de Estudios y Formación Actoral